Aune Mänttäri (née Partanen; born 23 July 1936 in Kontiolahti) is a Finnish market gardener and politician. She was a member of the Parliament of Finland, representing the Finnish Rural Party (SMP) in 1972 and the Finnish People's Unity Party (SKYP) from 1972 to 1975.

References

1936 births
Living people
People from Kontiolahti
Finnish Lutherans
Finnish Rural Party politicians
Finnish People's Unity Party politicians
Members of the Parliament of Finland (1972–75)
20th-century Finnish women politicians
Women members of the Parliament of Finland